Hnat Petrovych Yura (also Gnat Yura;  – January 18, 1966) was a Soviet and Ukrainian director, actor of theatre and film, pedagogue. He directed two films, and appeared on screen six times during the Soviet era. Yura received titles of professor (1946), People's Actor of Ukraine (1930), and People's Actor of the Soviet Union (1940).

Biography
Yura was born in village Fedvar (today Pidlisne). His stage experience has started in 1904 within an amateur club, while his professional performance started in 1907 as part of the Maksymovych troupe. Before the World War I he emigrated to Austria-Hungary where in 1913–1914 performed as an actor at the Ruska Besida Association theater in Lemberg (Lviv). Soon after the start of the war in 1916–1919 Yura was a member of the "Molodyi Teatr" theatre (Les Kurbas troupe) located in Kiev. In 1919 "Molodyi Teatr" was added to the newly reformed First Theater of the Ukrainian Soviet Socialist Republic based on the State Drama Theater of Ukraine. In 1920 a group of former "Molodyi Theatre" led by Yura joined "Novyi Lvivskyi Teatr" which in Vinnytsia was reformed into the Franko Ukrainian Drama Theatre and for the first few years (1920–1923) was touring Ukraine.

Selected filmography
 Prometheus (1936)
 Cossacks Beyond the Danube (1937) 
 Shchors (1939)
 Taras Shevchenko (1951)
 The Unforgettable Year 1919 (1952)
 Martin Borulya (1953)

References

Bibliography 
 James Steffen. The Cinema of Sergei Parajanov. University of Wisconsin Pres, 2013.

External links 
 
 

1888 births
1966 deaths
People from Kirovohrad Oblast
People from Kherson Governorate
Emigrants from the Russian Empire to Austria-Hungary
Ukrainian film directors
Ukrainian male stage actors
Ukrainian male film actors
Soviet film directors
Soviet male stage actors
Soviet male film actors
Ukrainian Discourse Theatre
Academic staff of Kyiv National I. K. Karpenko-Kary Theatre, Cinema and Television University
First convocation members of the Verkhovna Rada of the Ukrainian Soviet Socialist Republic
Second convocation members of the Verkhovna Rada of the Ukrainian Soviet Socialist Republic
Third convocation members of the Verkhovna Rada of the Ukrainian Soviet Socialist Republic
Fourth convocation members of the Verkhovna Rada of the Ukrainian Soviet Socialist Republic
Fifth convocation members of the Verkhovna Rada of the Ukrainian Soviet Socialist Republic
Recipients of the title of People's Artists of Ukraine
People's Artists of the USSR
Burials at Baikove Cemetery